Lovelock Cave (NV-Ch-18) is a North American archaeological site previously known as Sunset Guano Cave, Horseshoe Cave, and Loud Site 18. Lovelock Cave is one of the most important classic sites of the Great Basin region because the conditions of the cave are conducive to the preservation of organic and inorganic material. The cave was placed on the National Register of Historic Places on May 24, 1984. It was the first major cave in the Great Basin to be excavated, and the Lovelock Cave people are part of the University of California Archaeological Community's Lovelock Cave Station.

History
The large rock shelter is north of modern-day Humboldt Sink. Lovelock Cave is in the Lake Lahontan region, next to the former lakebed of Lake Lahontan. It was formed by the lake's currents and wave action. It was first a rock shelter. Eventually an earthquake collapsed the overhang of the mouth. Lake Lahontan was a large Pleistocene pluvial lake that covered much of western Nevada. Due to drier Holocene climate the water elevation dropped and much smaller lakes remain such as Lake Humboldt, Pyramid Lake, and Carson Lake. The dry environment of the cave resulted in a wealth of well-preserved artifacts that provide a glimpse on how people lived in the area. Lovelock Cave was in use as early as 2580 BC but was not intensively inhabited until around 1000 BC. People occupied Lovelock Cave for over 4,000 years. The initial discoveries of artifacts and excavations, in the early 20th century, were not very well executed, which resulted in a loss of archaeological information. However more recent investigations were more careful and meticulous. A wealth of knowledge pertaining to life on the Great Basin has come from this important site because many unique artifacts have been successfully recovered.

Earliest discovery of artifacts
In 1911 two miners, David Pugh and James Hart, were hired to mine for bat guano from the cave to be used as fertilizer. Heizer and Napton's review of the excavation states “[the guano] was dug up from the upper cave deposits, screened on the hillside outside the cave, and shipped to a fertilizer company in San Francisco.” Miners had dumped the top layers of Lovelock into a heap outside of the cave. The miners were aware of the artifacts but only the most interesting specimens were saved. Unfortunately, the first exploration was unsystematic and the loss of material and damage to the site strata was considerable in large portions of the cave. L.L. Loud of the Anthropology Department at the University of California was contacted by the mining company when the refuse left by the ancient people proved so plentiful that fertilizer could no longer be collected.

First archaeological investigation
In the spring of 1912 A.L. Kroeber sent L. L. Loud, an employee of the Museum of Anthropology, University of California to recover any materials that remained from the guano mining of the previous year. Loud excavated Lovelock Cave for five months and reportedly collected roughly 10,000 material remains. The majority of the archaeological record was gathered from three areas: a dump outside the cave left by miners, lower level deposits from the northwest end of the cave, and undisturbed refuse along the outlying edges of the cave. Unfortunately, Loud did not maintain a comprehensive report of the excavation so detailed information is not available. The method and procedure of archaeological excavations has improved over the years and Loud's excavation does not fit into the standards of today's practices. He labeled the individual dig locations as “lots” without establishing any grid system. Grid systems are used to determine origin and depth of archaeological record. Loud recorded 41 lots. Heizer and Napton tried to further detail Loud's findings but because Loud was not consistent with his methods of recording data their efforts were ineffective.

Later excavations
Twelve years after the first excavation Loud returned to Lovelock Cave with M.R. Harrington in the summer of 1924. The Museum of the American Indian, Heye Foundation, New York commissioned Harrington and Loud, who, assisted by local Paiute Indians, attempted to recover any materials left from previous investigations. They found leftover fragments that had been ignored by collectors in the east end and center of the cave. The team also dug to the base of the deposits in the west end. This excavation resulted in the discovery of the famous duck decoy cache.

The American Museum of Natural History sponsored Nels Nelson to conduct a surface collection of Lovelock Cave in 1936. However, no archaeological material recovered was admitted to the museum's collection.

Robert Heizer came to Lovelock Cave in 1949 to collect organic material for radiocarbon dating. He later returned in 1950 and 1965 with a field group to sift through the remains that the miners left behind in a slope in front of the cave and collect coprolites. In excavations with Lewis Napton during 1968 and 1969 disturbed human remains were discovered. The remains found were so scattered that a complete recovery was never possible. Human coprolites found at Lovelock Cave are instrumental in piecing together the cultures’ subsistence patterns, specifically the kinds of food the Indians were eating: primarily birds, fish and other fauna that lived near the lake, as well as vegetation which was collected and stored for winter months. Furthermore, because coprolites are organic material, they could be dated with the radiocarbon dating technique.

Duck decoys
The most renowned discovery at Lovelock Cave was a cache of eleven duck decoys M.R. Harrington and L.L. Loud found when they were digging for the Museum of the American Indian in 1924 in Pit 12, Lot 4. The cache included eight painted and feathered decoys and three unfinished decoys. Items found in the same pit consisted of feathers and two bundles of animal traps. The remarkable decoys were made from bundled tule, a long grass-like herb, covered in feathers and painted.

The first attempt to date the decoys with radiocarbon dating techniques in 1969 was unsuccessful because the material got lost. Later samples could not be acquired without causing extensive damage to the decoys so they were not dated until the development of the Accelerator mass spectrometry  (AMS) dating technique. Technological advances with AMS dating meant that much smaller, milligram-size, specimens from archaeological record were ample size for dating. Samples were retrieved from two duck decoys and A. J. T. Tull of the University of Arizona, Tucson conducted the dating of the specimens. In 1984 he reported the dates to Don D. Fowler. Duck Decoy 13/4513, Lovelock Cave was dated at 2,080 +/- 330 BP, and Duck Decoy 13/4512B was dated at 2,250 +/- 230BP.

Prehistoric sling
A hand woven textile sling was collected by Loud in 1912 but it was not reported or studied extensively until years later. Archaeologists are interested in the specific specimen because it is recognized as one of the earliest slings in North America. The Indians of the Northern Paiute or Paviotso were occupants of the area during historic times and they recognized the sling as a toy or used for hunting and war. Slings were known to serve different purposes such as a toy, a forehead band, or a mechanism for hunting birds. The design of the sling found at Lovelock was constructed through a simple knotting technique from a two-ply yarn. The pattern on the sling is reversible. It was likely made from various pieces of available fiber. The sling found at Lovelock is just one of the many handmade textile items of the cave. Traps and nets were also crafted to assist hunters during their search for food. Baskets and other food storage items were used to ensure that during times of resource scarcity everyone would have enough food for survival.

Dating
The burials from Lovelock Cave do not appear to be similar to the earlier burials from Spirit Cave or to the later burials from Stillwater Marsh. The eight burials from Lovelock Cave were buried at various times between 4,500 and 900 years B.P.

There are also the similar, approximately contemporaneous Elephant Mountain Cave bundle burials from the Black Rock Desert north of Lovelock, Nevada. The site was extensively looted, and its study is difficult. A pair of sandals from the cave have been radiocarbon dated to 10,000 years ago, making them the oldest footwear ever found in Nevada and among the oldest in the world.

Life at Lovelock Cave
Humans utilized the cave starting around 2580 BC but it was not intensively used until 1000 BC. Two competing hypotheses arose from the investigations of Lovelock Cave. Heizer and Napton supported a limnosedentary theory pertaining to life at the site. This view held that people of the area rarely moved from their base because they had access to such rich and varied resources. This theory is based on the coprolitic material found at Lovelock which revealed a primary diet of fish and diverse lakeside fare. A limnomobile view suggests that sites such as Lovelock were only occupied during certain times throughout the year and people in the area were very mobile. Lovelock Cave is believed to have been occupied extensively during the winter months. Summer months may have been plagued with insects that would make life near a marsh undesirable. The findings at the site reveal lengthy periods of occupation and also show the complicated techniques used by hunters and gatherers to acquire resources.

Lovelock Cave overlooks Humboldt Sink, a remnant of Lake Lahontan. The human coprolites recovered from Lovelock Cave reveal that 90 percent of the diet came from Humboldt Sink. All sizes of fish were eaten and hunting techniques included the use of nets, traps, and hooks made from fishbone. Dietary staples include: Lahontan Chub, ducks, and mudhens. Plants such as bulrush, cattail, and other grasses were also significant food sources. The environment of the Great Basin is very diverse. The amount of rainfall varies year to year. A wet year can potentially produce six times more vegetation than a dry year. Hunter-gatherers of the Great Basin survived on a wide variety of resources to adapt to a changing environment. The inhabitants of Lovelock Cave were fortunate to live around a rich lowland marsh as the duck and goose decoys were ideal for hunting in such areas. Mosquitoes and other insects were troublesome pests to people of the marshes during summer months.

Subsistence patterns and adaptations varied greatly among Great Basin groups. People living in mountainous areas were surviving on plants for more than fifty percent of their diets whereas people around water or in the marshes were hunting fish and other wetland wildlife. Waterfowl have been attracted to Great Basin marshes for thousands of years. Ancient hunter-gatherer inhabitants of Lovelock Cave became expert bird hunters. They used their well-designed duck decoys to lure prey then shoot birds from blinds. As hunters became more experienced they would wear disguises made from reeds or duck skin and stalk birds then surprise and grab them by the legs. The people at Lovelock recognized the importance of water fowl and utilized birds extensively. Archaeological specimens from the site show that the inhabitants collected feathers from geese, ducks, pelicans, and herons. The hunter-gathers used the feathers from the birds to create decoys which allowed the capture of more birds. Decoys are still used by local native people today in hunting water fowl.

Hunters were also able to rely on a variety of fauna such as muskrat, rabbit, and rodents as foodstuff. Gathers were harvesting vegetables and grasses in the spring and fall to supplement their rich diet. The women of the group were likely the gatherers and also responsible for crafting important items to make life easier in the marsh. Fibers from dogbane and milkweed were used to fashion yarns and baskets. Baskets were used to store food, especially vegetation that was harvested in the spring and fall to be saved for winter months. Women would occasionally collect fish with smaller baskets.

The ideal conditions at Lovelock Cave preserved deposits of feathers from various birds and textiles from nets. Common fibrous items include: nets, baskets, sandals, traps, and decoys. Manos and metates, hand-held grinding stones, were abundantly used by Native people; they helped to process plant foods, especially seeds, nuts, and other tough material. The materials recovered from Lovelock Cave helped to demonstrate that hunting and gathering was the primary means of survival for Native Americans of the Great Basin for thousands of years. The diversity of resources allowed the people in the area to thrive using traditional methods for a long period of time, and whose material culture remained the same for thousands of years.

The cave's last use is believed to be in the mid-1800s as indicated by a gun cache and a human coprolite.  The material was tested through radiocarbon dating and dated to about 1850.

Si-Te-Cah

According to Paiute oral history, the Si-Te-Cah or Sai'i are a legendary tribe of red-haired cannibalistic giants. Adrienne Mayor writes about the Si-Te-Cah in her book, Fossil Legends of the First Americans. She suggests that the 'giant' interpretation of the skeletons from Lovelock Cave and other dry caves in Nevada was started by entrepreneurs setting up tourist displays and that the skeletons themselves were of normal size. She also discusses the reddish hair, pointing out that hair pigment is not stable after death and that various factors such as temperature, soil, etc. can turn ancient very dark hair to a rusty-red color.

References

External links 

 Virtual tour of the cave
 Lovelock Cave
 Decoys
 Hearst Museum Article
 Lovelock Artifacts
 Lovelock Pictures
 

Caves of Nevada
Show caves in the United States
Limestone caves
Landforms of Churchill County, Nevada
Archaeological sites on the National Register of Historic Places in Nevada
Tourist attractions in Churchill County, Nevada
National Register of Historic Places in Churchill County, Nevada